Down House is a 2001 Russian comedy-gross-out film by Roman Kachanov, a modern interpretation of the 1869 novel The Idiot by Fyodor Dostoevsky.

The film received the Special Jury Prize at Kinotavr.

Premise
The plot is set in modern Moscow, probably in the second half of the 1990s, with  "New Russians", Hummer H1 jeeps, bribery, violence, truckfuls of tinned stew as a dowry, and so on. The film is quite far from the novel's subject, but still keeps to the main storyline. It features Fyodor Bondarchuk as Myshkin, and a soundtrack by DJ Groove, one of the most popular Russian DJs (who appears in the film as a taxi driver).

In Russian, Даун (Down) primarily refers to a person with Down syndrome, or, colloquially, to anyone retarded or just stupid, so it is similar to Idiot; while  Хаус (House) refers to House music, which is used extensively in the film. The name is also a reference to the tendency of Russian subcultures such as businessmen, hackers and hippies to make heavy use of words borrowed from English and transliterated into the Russian alphabet.

Cast
Fyodor Bondarchuk – Prince Myshkin
Ivan Okhlobystin – Parfyon Rogozhin
Anna Buklovskaya – Nastasya Filippovna
Aleksandr Bashirov – Ferdyshchenko
Mikhail Vladimirov – Ganya Ivolgin
Jerzy Stuhr – General Ivolgin (voiced by Valentin Smirnitsky)
Valentina Sharykina – general's wife Ivolgina
Galina Kashkovskaya – Varya Ivolgina
Juozas Budraitis – General Epanchin (voiced by Boris Khimichev)
Barbara Brylska – general's wife Epanchina
Elena Kotelnikova – Aglaya Epanchina
Artemy Troitsky – Totsky

References

External links

 RusFilm

2001 films
2000s Russian-language films
2001 black comedy films
Films based on The Idiot
Films set in Moscow
Russian black comedy films
Russian crime comedy-drama films
Films directed by Roman Kachanov
2000s crime comedy-drama films